National College, Taliparamba is a private college located in Taliparamba, Kannur district, in the state of Kerala, India. It was founded over 46 years ago.

Academics
National College conducts courses of Calicut university on a private registration basis.  More than 1,500 students are enrolled in the college. The college has a library and a computer lab.

Location
The college has one campus in Taliparamba

Courses Conducted
The college conducts undergraduate and post graduate courses offered by Kannur University and INGOU.

Colleges in Kerala
Universities and colleges in Kannur district